The pinewoods shiner (Lythrurus matutinus) is a species of cyprinid fish, and one of the six species endemic to North Carolina. The fish is about 8.6 cm. in length, and is the fourth longest fish endemic to North Carolina. The fish also has red tail, dorsal, and pelvic fins. The rest of it is gray, except for the area right under the dorsal fin.

References

Lythrurus
Fish described in 1870
Fish of the Eastern United States
Freshwater fish of the United States
Endemic fauna of North Carolina